The D arm is a feature in the tertiary structure of transfer RNA (tRNA). It is composed of the two D stems and the D loop. The D loop contains the base dihydrouridine, for which the arm is named. The D loop's main function is that of recognition. It is widely believed that it acts as a recognition site for aminoacyl-tRNA synthetase, an enzyme involved in the aminoacylation of the tRNA molecule. The D stem is also believed to have a recognition role although this has yet to be verified.

It is a highly variable region and is notable for its unusual conformation due to the over-crowding on one of the guanosine residues. It appears to play a large role in the stabilization of the tRNA's tertiary structure.

References

RNA